Malam is a name. Notable people with this name include:

Surname
 Albert Malam (1913–1992), English football player
 Brady Malam (born 1973), New Zealand rugby league football player
 Daouda Malam Wanké (1946–2004), military and political leader in Niger
 Gaston Malam (born 1952), Cameroonian sprinter
 Halidou Malam (born 1976), Cameroonian football player
 John Malam, British historian
 Ram Singh Malam, Indian navigator, architect and craftsman

Given name
 Malam Bacai Sanhá (1947–2012), Guinea-Bissau politician
 Malam Saguirou, Niger filmmaker
 Malam Wakili (born 1958), Nigerian politician
 Peter Malam Brothers (1917–2008), Royal Air Force fighter pilot and flying ace

Other
 Diospyros malam or Diospyros areolata